United States v. Seeger, 380 U.S. 163 (1965), was a case in which the United States Supreme Court ruled that the exemption from the military draft for conscientious objectors could be reserved not only for those professing conformity with the moral directives of a supreme being but also for those whose views on war derived from a "sincere and meaningful belief which occupies in the life of its possessor a place parallel to that filled by the God of those" who had routinely gotten the exemption.

The case resolved, on diverse but related grounds, three cases, each involving conviction for failure to accept induction into the armed forces on the part of someone who sought conscientious-objector status without "belong[ing] to an orthodox religious sect". The accused, whose cases were otherwise unrelated, were Arno Sascha Jakobson, Forest Britt Peter, and Daniel Andrew Seeger; it was Seeger's case that gave its name to the multi-case decision.

See also
 List of United States Supreme Court cases, volume 380
 Welsh v. United States, 398 U.S. 333.

References

Further reading
 In stillness there is fullness: a peacemaker's harvest: essays and reflections in honor of Daniel A. Seeger's four decades of Quaker service; edited by Peter Bien and Chuck Fager, Belfonte, Pennsylvania, Kimo Press, . This festschrift includes:
 "Excerpts from and comments on a Thesis called 'The challenge to the Supreme Court of the case United States v. Seeger'" by Margery W. Rubin
 "The Seeger decision" by L. William Yolton
 "The Supreme Court decision"

External links
 
 

Conscientious objection
 United States Supreme Court cases
 United States Supreme Court cases of the Warren Court
1965 in United States case law
 American Civil Liberties Union litigation
 United States military case law